Geoffrey Franklin Miller (born 1965) is an American evolutionary psychologist, author, and associate professor of psychology at the University of New Mexico. He is known for his research on sexual selection in human evolution.

Education, career, and personal life
Born in Cincinnati, Ohio, Miller graduated from Columbia University in 1987, where he earned a BA in biology and psychology. He received his PhD in cognitive psychology from Stanford University in 1993, under the guidance of Roger Shepard.

Miller has held positions as a postdoctoral researcher in the evolutionary and adaptive systems group in the School of Cognitive and Computing Sciences at the University of Sussex (1992–94); lecturer in the department of psychology at the University of Nottingham (1995); research scientist at the Center for Adaptive Behavior and Cognition at the Max Planck Institute for Psychological Research, Munich, Germany (1995–96); and senior research fellow at the Centre for Economic Learning and Social Evolution, University College London (1996–2000). He has worked at the University of New Mexico since 2001, where he is associate professor. In 2009, he was visiting scientist at the Genetic Epidemiology Group, Queensland Institute of Medical Research, Australia.

In 2015, in collaboration with writer Tucker Max, Miller launched The Mating Grounds, a podcast and blog offering advice about men's sexual strategies.

Miller has an adult daughter and also helped raise two teenage stepchildren from a previous relationship.

On November 29, 2019, he married fellow American evolutionary psychologist Diana Fleischman. The couple had earlier appeared together in an interview, advocating for polyamory. They had their first child together in the spring of 2022.

Research

Human cognition

Miller's 2003 book, The Mating Mind: How Sexual Choice Shaped the Evolution of Human Nature, proposes that human mate choices, courtship behavior, behavior genetics, psychometrics, and life cycle patterns support the survival value of traits related to sexual selection, such as art, morality, language, and creativity. According to Miller, the adaptive design features of these traits suggest that they evolved through mutual mate choice by both sexes to advertise intelligence, creativity, moral character, and heritable fitness. He also cites the Fisherian runaway, a model created by Ronald Fisher to explain phenomena such as the peacock's plumage as forming through a positive feedback loop through sexual selection, as well as the handicap principle.

In an article entitled What should we be worried about? Miller talked about  eugenics in China and how Deng Xiaoping instigated the one-child policy, "partly to curtail China's population explosion, but also to reduce dysgenic fertility". He argued that if China is successful, and given what he calls the lottery of Mendelian genetics, it may increase the IQ of its population, perhaps by 5–15 IQ points per generation. In an evaluation of Chinese population policy, he openly supports it by stating:There is unusually close cooperation in China between government, academia, medicine, education, media, parents, and consumerism in promoting a utopian Han ethno-state. Given what I understand of evolutionary behavior genetics, I expect — and hope — that they will succeed. The welfare and happiness of the world's most populous country depends upon it.He concludes that if these politics are successful, it "would be game over for Western global competitiveness" within a couple of generations, and hopes the West will join China in this eugenic experiment rather than citing "bioethical panic" in order to attack these policies.

Consumerism
In his 2009 book, Spent: Sex, Evolution and the Secrets of Consumerism, Miller used Darwinism to gain an understanding of consumerism and how marketing has exploited our inherited instincts to display social status for reproductive advantage. He argues that in the modern marketing-dominated culture, "coolness" at the conscious level, and the consumption choices it drives, is an aberration of the genetic legacy of two million years of living in small groups, where social status has been a critical force in reproduction. Miller's thesis is that marketing persuades people—particularly the young—that the most effective way to display that status is through consumption choices, rather than conveying such traits as intelligence and personality through more natural means of communication, such as simple conversation.

Miller argues that marketing limits its own success by using simplistic models of human nature, lacking the insights of evolutionary psychology and behavioural ecology, with a belief "that premium products are bought to display wealth, status, and taste, and they miss the deeper mental traits that people are actually wired to display, traits such as kindness, intelligence, and creativity", which limits the success of marketing.

Abnormal psychology
Miller's clinical interests are the application of fitness indicator theory to understand the symptoms, demographics, and behavior genetics of schizophrenia and mood disorders. His other interests include the origins of human preferences, aesthetics, utility functions, human strategic behavior, game theory, experiment-based economics, the ovulatory effects on female mate preferences, and the intellectual legacies of Darwin, Friedrich Nietzsche, and Thorstein Veblen.

In 2007, Miller (with Joshua Tybur and Brent Jordan) published an article in Evolution and Human Behavior, concluding that lap dancers make more money during ovulation. For this paper, Miller won the 2008 Ig Nobel Award in Economics.

Virtue signaling
Miller has written extensively about virtue signalling, describing it to be an innate human act used as a psychological and political tool. He applies the concept of virtue signaling to his own life living as a libertarian in a politically divided climate with a politically fertile upbringing, and criticizes the use of the term as it pertains to the expression of free speech.

Controversy
In June 2013, controversy arose after Miller tweeted: "Dear obese PhD applicants: if you didn't have the willpower to stop eating carbs, you won't have the willpower to do a dissertation #truth". Miller faced criticism from some students and faculty that he perpetuated the social stigma of obesity. He later released an apology and said that it was part of a "research project". Institutional review boards at the University of New Mexico, Miller's home university, and New York University, where he was a visiting professor, released statements saying that Miller's tweet was "self-promotional" and cannot be considered research. Miller was taken off all admissions committees for the remainder of the year and required to complete a sensitivity training project, meet with the department chair, and apologize to his colleagues. The University of New Mexico formally censured Miller in August 2013.

Bibliography
 
 
 Geher; Geoffrey Miller (eds), Mating Intelligence: Sex, Relationships, and the Mind's Reproductive System, New York: Lawrence Erlbaum Associates, 2008.

References

External links
 
 

1965 births
Living people
Academics of University College London
Academics of the University of Nottingham
American agnostics
21st-century American psychologists
Evolutionary psychologists
Human evolution theorists
Columbia College (New York) alumni
People associated with effective altruism
Stanford University School of Humanities and Sciences alumni
University of New Mexico faculty
20th-century American psychologists